Sentosa is a state constituency in Selangor, Malaysia.

Sentosa was created in the 2016 redistribution and was first represented in the Selangor State Legislative Assembly in 2018. The seat was called Kota Alam Shah prior to the 2018 redelineation. Sentosa is represented under the Kota Raja parliamentary constituency. It is currently represented by Gunarajah George from Pakatan Harapan.

Sentosa is the first Indian majority state constituency in the state of Selangor. It consists of 43% Indian, 38% Chinese, 17% Malay and 1% other voters.

Demographics

History

Polling districts 
According to the federal gazette issued on 30 March 2018, the Sentosa constituency is divided into 13 polling districts.

Representation history

Election Results

References 

The Redelineation Report issued by the Election Commission of Malaysia

http://www.federalgazette.agc.gov.my/outputp/pub_20160429_P.U.(B)197.pdf

Selangor State Legislative Assembly
Selangor state constituencies